The Nerve Agents EP is the self-titled debut release from Californian hardcore punk band, The Nerve Agents. It was released in November, 1998 on Revelation Records.

It was produced and engineered by Paul Miner, now known for his extensive production credits and, most notably, for his work in the band, Death by Stereo.

It was followed by the band's first full-length album, Days Of The White Owl, in 2000, also on Revelation Records.

Overview 
The Nerve Agents play a brand of hardcore punk which is influenced by the likes of Youth of Today, Circle Jerks, Black Flag, Cause For Alarm, 7 Seconds, and Cro-Mags. 

They play short, often fast-paced, songs with a distinctive vocal style – alternating yelling with growling.

Track listing 
All tracks written by The Nerve Agents
 "Carpe Diem" – 1:27
 "Unblossomed" – 1:43
 "The War's Not Over" – 1:37
 "Level 4 Outbreak" – 2:01
 "Share the Pain" – 2:02
 "Starting Point" – 3:01
 "Black Sheep" – 1:33
 "I Keep Screaming" – 1:53

Credits 
 Eric Ozenne – vocals
 Tim Presley – guitar
 Kevin Cross – guitar, bass, vocals – credited as Kevin C. and K. Cross respectively
 Andy Granelli – drums
 Recorded in May, 1998 at For The Record, Orange, California, USA
 Produced and engineered by Paul Miner
 Front cover art by Duncan Long

Miscellanea 
 According to the liner notes, "Level 4 Outbreak" was inspired by Richard Preston's non-fiction bio-thriller, The Hot Zone.

See also 
 Redemption 87's album, All Guns Poolside – Eric Ozenne's previous band

External links 
 Epitaph / Hellcat Records band page
 Revelation Records' Nerve Agents EP page

The Nerve Agents albums
1998 debut EPs